Institute of Economics, Academia Sinica (IEAS) is an economic research organizations in Taiwan. Early in its history, it focused on local issues, and later, expanded to explore more theoretical issues.

The Institute offers a Ph.D. program in economics, which is designed to provide students with a strong foundation in economic theory, econometrics, and quantitative methods, and to prepare them for careers in academia, government, and the private sector.

History
The organization was established in October 1962. In 1970, the organization began publishing Taiwan's first economic forecasting journal.

Organizational structures
 Research Staff
 Recruiting Committee
 Editorial Board of Academia Economic Papers
 Editorial Board of Taiwan Economic Forecasts and Policy
 Committee on Academic Seminar Plans
 Library Committee
 Computer Committee 
 Recreation Committee
 Administrative Staff

Journals published by IEAS
Taiwan Economic Forecasts and Policy - Founded in 1970
Academia Economic Papers - Founded in 1973

Directors
 Hsing Mu-huan
 Yu Tzong-shian
 Paul Liu
 Lee Yung-san
 Shea Jia-dong
 Hu Sheng-cheng
 Kuan Chung-ming
 Peng Shin-kun
 Kamhon Kan

See also
Academia Sinica
Economy of Taiwan
Taiwan Institute of Economic Research
Chung-Hua Institution for Economic Research

References

1962 establishments in Taiwan
Academia Sinica
Economic research institutes in Taiwan